Tenkula is a surname. Notable people with the surname include:

Jarno Tenkula (born 1982), Finnish footballer
Miika Tenkula (1974–2009), Finnish musician

Finnish-language surnames